Cameron Memorial Airport  is a public use airport in Clinton County, Missouri, United States. It is owned by the city of Cameron and located two nautical miles (4 km) southwest of its central business district. This airport is included in the National Plan of Integrated Airport Systems, which categorized it as a general aviation facility.

Although many U.S. airports use the same three-letter location identifier for the FAA and IATA, this airport is assigned EZZ by the FAA but has no designation from the IATA.

Facilities and aircraft 
Cameron Memorial Airport covers an area of 202 acres (82 ha) at an elevation of 1,040 feet (317 m) above mean sea level. It has one runway designated 17/35 with a concrete surface measuring 4,000 by 75 feet (1,219 x 23 m).

For the 12-month period ending December 31, 2012, the airport had 7,035 aircraft operations, an average of 19 per day: 95% general aviation, 4% air taxi, and 1% military. At that time there were 29 aircraft based at this airport: 86% single-engine, 10% ultralight, and 3% multi-engine.

See also 
 List of airports in Missouri

References

External links 
 Airport page at City of Cameron website
  at Missouri DOT Airport Directory
 Aerial image as of February 1996 from USGS The National Map
 
 

Airports in Missouri
Transportation in Clinton County, Missouri
Buildings and structures in Clinton County, Missouri